Alan Bond Johnson (born January 14, 1939) is a United States district judge of the United States District Court for the District of Wyoming.

Education and career
Born in Cheyenne, Wyoming, Johnson received a Bachelor of Arts degree from Vanderbilt University in 1961 and a Juris Doctor from the University of Wyoming College of Law in 1964. He was in the United States Air Force from 1964 to 1967, and then in private practice in Cheyenne] from 1968 to 1971. Johnson was then a United States magistrate judge for the District of Wyoming from 1971 to 1974. He joined the Wyoming Air National Guard in 1973. Johnson was a substitute judge of the Municipal Court of Cheyenne, Wyoming from 1973 to 1974, and a judge on the Wyoming state district court from 1974 to 1985.

Federal judicial service
On October 22, 1985, Johnson was nominated by President Ronald Reagan to a new seat on the United States District Court for the District of Wyoming created by 98 Stat. 333. He was confirmed by the United States Senate on December 16, 1985, and received his commission on December 17, 1985. He served as Chief Judge from 1992 to 1999. As of 2020, he remains the last judge appointed by a Republican president to the District of Wyoming.

Portrait

Johnson's official portrait was painted by artist Michele Rushworth and was unveiled and installed in the federal courthouse in Cheyenne, Wyoming in 2012.

References

Sources
 

1939 births
Living people
University of Wyoming College of Law alumni
Wyoming state court judges
Judges of the United States District Court for the District of Wyoming
United States district court judges appointed by Ronald Reagan
20th-century American judges
Wyoming Republicans
United States Air Force officers
United States magistrate judges
21st-century American judges
Wyoming National Guard personnel